American Samoa competed at the 2011 Pacific Games in Nouméa New Caledonia between August 27 and September 10, 2011. As of June 28, 2011 American Samoa has listed 159 competitors.

Baseball

American Samoa has qualified a team.  Each team can have a maximum of 20 athletes.

Men
Leuma Fualefau Jr
Sailiilemalooleatua Laolagi
John Love
Pemerika Mahuka
Ikaika Mahuka
Samuel Sili
Timoteo Solaita
Louis Sola'ita
Daniel Va'a
Christopher Eneli
Vili Fa'Apouli
Fritz Helg
Joseph Langkilde III
Makerita Pu'e
John Pu'e
Frederick Thomas Jr
Derek Tupuola

Basketball

American Samoa has qualified a men's and women's team.  Each team can consist of a maximum of 12 athletes

Men
Josten Meredith
Christopher Samia
Earvin Magic Le'iato
Talalelei Manusamoa Toomalatai
Tutuila Maalaelu
Shaun Tuiaana Salave'a
Jason Jerry Rishi
Roman Rishi
Johnathan Tausili
Fitimauea Kerisiano Talaeai
Myron Paul Sagapolu
William James McCoy

Women
Latoya Marshall
Shnaiah Ruby Magalei
Charmay Elizabeth Magalei
Shara Tauai-Yandall
Ursula Fitimaleafa Te'o Martin
Maleleiga Sobczak
Mahana Pipii Puaina
Lauren Selusia Folau

Football

American Samoa has qualified a men's and women's team.  Each team can consist of a maximum of 21 athletes. 

Men
Nicky Salapu
Terrence Sinapati
Edgar Apulu
Daru Tavita Taumua
Rafe Talalelei Luvu
Natia Natia
Ismael D'Angelo Herrera
Moe Casperpona Kuresa
Liatama Jr Amisone
Frederick Charles Uhrle
Shalom Luani
Suani Uelese
Uasi Heleta
Pesamino Victor
Johnny Saelua
Travis Pita Sinapati
Lemusa Alatasi
Chin-Fu Ta'ase

Women
Sancia Savaliitoga L Sopoaga
Meleane Ioapo
Fuataina Siatuu
Filiga Ioapo
Fiso Letoi
Lynn Togitoto Tualaulelei
Tu'iemanu Ripley
Julliam Jasmine Muasau
Moaga Siaulaiga
Lela Jessica Waetin
Nicholette Tolmie
Ava Manao
Kristina Vaeao
Trixie Mavaega
Tasi Alailesulu
Alma Manao
Fiapaipai April Siatuu

Golf

American Samoa has qualified 3 athletes.

Men
Pemerika Gillet
Willie Teleso

Women
Fulisia Samoa

Judo

American Samoa has qualified 2 athletes.

Men
Tasele Scanlan
Anthony Telemakasu Liu

Rugby Sevens

American Samoa has qualified a men's team.  Each team can consist of a maximum of 12 athletes, and 6 non-traveling reserves.

Men
Feite Okesene
Iakopo Atonio
McClusky Fa'Agata Jr
Finau Noa
Melea Timo
Joseph Ray Poyer
Nard Junior Umayam
David Laban
Niki-Kata Lua
Ross Telea Poyer
Tasiivavaluvalu Tapuala
Esau Time

Non-Traveling Reserves
Melani Nanai-Vai
Yonah Muasau
Faitio Failautusi
Falelua Hall
John Levaula
Matthew Mariota

Tennis

American Samoa has qualified 6 athletes.

Men
Christopher Huggai Sami, Jr.
Christian Martin Duchnak
Muka Godinet
Tamiano Joseph Gurr

Women
Florence Wasko
Leilani Marianne Duchnak

Triathlon

American Samoa has qualified 1 athlete.

Men
Daniel Lee

Volleyball

Beach Volleyball

American Samoa has qualified a men's team.  Each team can consist of a maximum of 2 members.

Men
Sigalu Selefuti Aitui
Sam Samasoni Luaiva

Indoor Volleyball

American Samoa has qualified a men's team.  Each team can consist of a maximum of 12 members.

Men
Paipa Mulitalo
Molesi Lomiga
Fiti Mamea Jr
Donosky Tautunuafatsi
Sam Samasoni Luaiva
Sam Mataia
Dominic Tautunuafatasi
Sovala Gaisoa
Sigalu Selefuti Aitui

Weightlifting

American Samoa has qualified 3 athletes.

Men
Saina Seumanutafa
Nevo Ioane
Tanumafili Jungblut

References

2011 in American Samoan sports
Nations at the 2011 Pacific Games
American Samoa at the Pacific Games